The Cacharel World Under-25 Championship was a professional golf tournament for under-25 golfers which was played annually in France from 1976 to 1983, except in 1977. In 1976 it was played in Évian-les-Bains but from 1978 to 1983 it was played in Nîmes.

It was an event on European Tour but prize money did not count towards the Order of Merit/Official Money List and a victory did not count as an official tour win; later such tournaments were designated as "approved special events". A similar event, the UAP European Under-25 Championship, was played in France from 1988.

The 1979 tournament was won by Bernhard Langer who triumphed by 17 strokes.

Winners

References

Defunct golf tournaments in France